Porto da Folha is a municipality located in the Brazilian state of Sergipe. It has a population of 28,693 (2020) and cover . Porto da Folha has a population density of 33 inhabitants per square kilometer.

The Igreja da Ilha de São Pedro dates to the beginning of the colonization of the region in the 18th century. The church is constructed of local stone masonry. It was designated a historic site by the State of Sergipe in 1984 and restored in 2011. A ruin beside the church may have been the monastery of the Capuchin friars, the earliest European settlers in the region.

Porto da Folha is home to the Xokó people, an indigenous group of 340 people. The Xokó live in the villages of São Pedro and Caiçara, both within Porto da Folha. Most of the community lives on Ilha de São Pedro.

References

Municipalities in Sergipe
Populated places established in 1835